Amir Salar may refer to:
 Amir Salar-e Olya, Firuzabad County
 Amir Salar, Jahrom
 Amir Salar-e Sar Tang, Jahrom County